Snoop Dogg Presents Algorithm (or simply titled Algorithm) is a compilation album by American rapper Snoop Dogg. Some publications described the recording as a compilation album, but the rapper's official website describes it as a studio album. Released on November 19, 2021 by Doggy Style Records and Def Jam Recordings and featured contributions from various artists including Method Man & Redman, Eric Bellinger, Usher, Blxst, Fabolous, and Dave East.

Background 
Following his appointment as executive creative consultant at Def Jam Recordings in June, Snoop Dogg officially announced the album on October 26, 2021. He subsequently released the singles "Big Subwoofer" on October 20 and "Murder Music" on November 5. He appeared on The Tonight Show Starring Jimmy Fallon on September 27 to tease the album, and he also appeared on the podcast The Joe Rogan Experience on November 12 in promotion of the album.

Critical reception

Algorithm received positive reviews from critics. At Metacritic, which assigns a normalized rating out of 100 to reviews from critics, the album received an average score of 70, which indicates "generally favorable reviews", based on nine reviews.

Commercial performance
Algorithm debuted at number 166 on the US Billboard 200, becoming his 26th entry on the Billboard 200. The album debuted at number 8 on the US Compilation Albums, marking Snoop Dogg's first album on the chart.

Track listing
Track listing adapted from Genius.

Charts

References

2021 albums
Snoop Dogg albums
Def Jam Recordings albums
Albums produced by Poo Bear